Ernest Paul (5 December 1881 – 9 September 1964) was a French professional road bicycle racer.

Paul was born in Villotte-sur-Ource, and was a half-brother of Tour de France-winner François Faber. Ernest Paul rode the Tour de France seven times, finished six times, and won two stages. He finished in the top 10 three times, his best final classification was his sixth place in 1909.  He died in Saint-Gatien-des-Bois, aged 82.

Major results

1909
Tour de France:
Winner stage 7
1910
Tour de France:
Winner stage 11

External links 

Official Tour de France results for Ernest Paul

French male cyclists
1881 births
1964 deaths
French Tour de France stage winners
Sportspeople from Côte-d'Or